Fugitive Pieces is a 2007 Canadian drama film directed by Jeremy Podeswa, who also adapted the film from the novel of the same name written by Anne Michaels. The film tells the story of Jakob Beer, who is orphaned in Poland during World War II and is saved by a Greek archeologist. The film premièred 6 September 2007 as the opening film of that year's Toronto International Film Festival (TIFF).

Cast

Production
Fugitive Pieces was in preproduction for seven years before filming started in various locations in Greece (Hydra, Kefalonia, and Lesvos) and various locations in Ontario, Canada (Hamilton and Toronto) in 2006 at a cost of $CAD9.5 million.

Matthew Davies was the production designer for the film. Peter Emmink was in charge of art direction. The costumes were designed by Anne Dixon. Set decoration was provided by Erica Milo and Nikos Triandafilopoulos. Visual effects were provided by Mr. X Inc. John Rowley was the music supervisor. Diane Pitblado was the dialect coach.

Release
Fugitive Pieces premièred on 6 September 2007 as the opening film of that year's Toronto International Film Festival. It was later shown at the Vancouver International Film Festival, the Warsaw International Film Festival, the Rome Film Festival, the International Thessaloniki Film Festival in Greece (where it was shown under the title Syntrimmia psyhis), the Santa Barbara International Film Festival and the Newport Beach Film Festival.

It opened in limited release in the United States on 2 May 2008, grossed $102,212 in 30 theatres its opening weekend, and earned a total US gross of $634,379.

Critical reception
, the review aggregator website Rotten Tomatoes reported that 68% of critics gave the film a positive review, based on 76 reviews. The website's consensus reads, "Though the retelling is a bit too subtle, the moving story and solid performances lift Fugitive Pieces beyond standard holocaust tales." Metacritic reported the film had an average score of 60 out of 100, based on 19 reviews — indicating mixed or average reviews.

Awards and nominations

The film won the jury award of the Newport Beach Film Festival in the categories Best Cinematographer (Gregory Middleton), Best Director and Best Screenplay (Jeremy Podeswa) and Best Film.

References

External links

2007 films
Canadian drama films
2007 drama films
Holocaust films
2000s English-language films
English-language Canadian films
2000s Greek-language films
Yiddish-language films
2000s German-language films
Films about orphans
Films based on Canadian novels
Films directed by Jeremy Podeswa
2009 drama films
2009 films
Serendipity Point Films films
2000s multilingual films
Canadian multilingual films
2000s Canadian films
Films shot in Lesbos